Lamoria ruficostella is a species of snout moth. It is found on Crete and in Russia.

References

Moths described in 1888
Tirathabini
Moths of Europe
Moths of Asia